Reid James Ribble (born April 5, 1956) is an American politician who was the U.S. representative for  from 2011 to 2017. He is a member of the Republican Party.

Early life and education
Ribble is a third generation Wisconsin resident. He was born in Neenah, Wisconsin. He graduated from Appleton East High School. After high school, he attended Cornerstone University.

Early career 
Ribble was employed by the Ribble Group, his family's commercial and residential roofing company in Kaukauna, Wisconsin, and later became the company's president. He was also the president of the National Roofing Contractors Association (NRCA) from 2005 to 2006.

U.S. House of Representatives

Elections

2010 

Ribble defeated two other candidates to win the Republican primary in September.

2012 

Ribble defeated Democratic nominee Jamie Wall, a business consultant.

2014 

Ribble defeated Democratic nominee Ron Gruett, a professor of physics and chemistry.

Tenure
Ribble has been described as a Libertarian leaning Republican.
Energy
Ribble believed we should utilize the "wide variety of available domestic sources to put our country on a path to energy independence." Reid Ribble voted YES on barring EPA from regulating greenhouse gases. To become self-sufficient, Ribble wanted to expand the usage of both renewable and fossil fuels, so that the U.S. will not rely too much on any single source or foreign region. In June 2012, he voted for the Domestic Energy and Jobs Act, which would increase oil and gas drilling in the U.S., and decrease environmental restrictions. In addition, Ribble also supported the Offshore Leasing Act in May 2011, and required "the Secretary of the Interior to conduct offshore oil and gas lease sales."

Agriculture
Coming from a state with a great economic emphasis on agriculture, Ribble advocated for continued success in the farming sector of Wisconsin. He favored less government regulation on farming, and wanted to reform several Environmental Protection Agency restrictions, believing that "Wisconsin's dairy farmers, livestock producers, and growers all will benefit from efforts to roll back EPA's overreach." He was a vocal member of the House Agriculture Committee, and has received a rating of 94% from the American Farm Bureau Federation as of 2011.

Budget
Ribble voted (March 2015) to support the Republican Study Committee budget. This was the most conservative of the various budget proposals considered by the House and was defeated by 294 to 132. Ribble went on to support the mainstream Republican budget proposed by Republican leadership, which was passed by the House.

Health Care
Ribble strongly disagreed with the 2010 Affordable Care Act, or Obamacare. In July 2012, he voted for the Repeals the Patient Protection and Affordable Care Act of 2010, stating that "instead of fixing the systematic flaws in our country's healthcare system it makes it even more costly and dysfunctional." He believed instead, that government should not be involved in the market and encourage greater competition between insurance companies.

Social Security
In a letter to House Speaker John Boehner dated October 8, 2013, Ribble proposed sweeping changes to Social Security, including continuing and accelerating increases in the retirement age, implementing the chained CPI benefit cut to Social Security, and means testing for Social Security recipients. Ribble's letter also proposed "gradually restoring the cap on wages subject to FICA to its Reagan-era levels."

Transportation 
In June 2015, Ribble introduced the Bridge to Sustainable Infrastructure Act. Jim Renacci co-sponsored the bill with Ribble. If signed into law, the bill would provide long-term funding to the Highway Trust Fund and federal programs to rebuild roads, highways and bridges. After introducing the bill, Ribble wrote in an opinion editorial on CNBC.com, " Our transportation infrastructure is ubiquitous, but it is not free."

Legislation
On September 20, 2013, the House passed a bipartisan measure championed by Ribble. The measure, titled the Restoring Healthy Forests for Healthy Communities Act, aims to manage commercial timberland and the yields each field can produce. Backers of the bill say that the bill would foster job growth in rural communities where the paper industry is prevalent, such as the Chequamegon-Nicolet National Forest in Wisconsin.

Committee assignments
 Committee on Agriculture (2011-2014)
 Subcommittee on Conservation, Energy, and Forestry
 Subcommittee on Livestock, Rural Development, and Credit
 Committee on the Budget (2011-2014)
 Committee on Foreign Affairs (2015-2016)
 Subcommittee on Europe, Eurasia, and Emerging Threats (Vice Chair, 2015–16)
 Subcommittee on Terrorism, Nonproliferation, and Trade
 Committee on Transportation and Infrastructure (2011-2016)
 Subcommittee on Aviation
 Subcommittee on Highways and Transit (Vice Chair, 2013–14)
 Subcommittee on Water Resources and Environment

Caucus memberships
 Liberty Caucus
 Problem Solvers Caucus, co-chair and founder
 Dairy Caucus, co-chair
 Paper Caucus, co-chair and founder
 Cranberry Caucus, co-chair and founder
 Fix Congress Now! Caucus, co-chair and founder

Retirement
On January 30, 2016, Ribble announced that he would not seek re-election for a fourth term to Congress, retiring based on a pledge that he would retire after his fourth term or eighth year in Congress, and expressed a desire to return to the private sector.

In February 2021, Ribble commented on the need for the Republican Party to move past Donald Trump, stating that he would have voted to impeach Donald Trump for his role in the 2021 United States Capitol attack.

In October 2022, Ribble joined the Council for Responsible Social Media project launched by Issue One to address the negative mental, civic, and public health impacts of social media in the United States co-chaired by former House Democratic Caucus Leader Dick Gephardt and former Massachusetts Lieutenant Governor Kerry Healey.

Electoral history

References

External links
 
 
 The Ribble Group, Inc.
 

1956 births
21st-century American politicians
People from Calumet County, Wisconsin
American construction businesspeople
Appleton East High School alumni
American libertarians
Businesspeople from Wisconsin
Cornerstone University alumni
Living people
Politicians from Appleton, Wisconsin
Politicians from Neenah, Wisconsin
Republican Party members of the United States House of Representatives from Wisconsin